Buford and the Galloping Ghost is an American animated television series and a spin-off of Yogi's Space Race produced by Hanna-Barbera Productions that was broadcast on NBC from September 9 to December 2, 1978. The half-hour series was composed of two 11-minute segments: The Buford Files and The Galloping Ghost.

The Buford Files and The Galloping Ghost originally aired as segments on Yogi's Space Race from September 9, 1978, to January 27, 1979. Following the cancellation of Yogi's Space Race, both segments were repackaged and spun off into a half-hour show on NBC from February 3 to September 1, 1979. The show has been rebroadcast on USA Cartoon Express, Cartoon Network and Boomerang.

The Buford Files
Buford is a lazy bloodhound with a mournful bark and a sharp nose for solving mysteries who lives deep in Fenokee Swamp. He teams up with the teenage Boggs twins, Cindy Mae and Woody. The trio solves confusing mysteries that baffle Sheriff Muletrain and his overeager but dimwitted deputy Goofer McGee. Buford's abilities are expanded with ears that revolve like radar dishes, and his nose responds to clues like a Geiger counter.

But Buford has two weaknesses: when the moon comes out, he howls incessantly (often at the most perilous moments), and he also has a running feud with a karate-whacking raccoon.

Voice cast
Frank Welker – Buford
Pat Parris – Cindy Mae
Dave Landsburg – Woody
Henry Corden – Sheriff Muletrain Pettigrew
Jim Nabors – Deputy Goofer McGee

The Galloping Ghost
Nugget Nose is a short and feisty ghost of an Old West gold prospector who finds adventure riding his invisible horse. He is also a guardian to Wendy and Rita, two young cowgirls who work at the Fuddy Dude Ranch, owned by grouchy, old Fenwick Fuddy. 

Whenever Fuddy threatens to fire the girls, Nugget makes himself invisible and becomes a helping friend. He is always battling Fuddy and takes delight in harassing him in odd and humorous ways. When the girls are in trouble, Wendy summons Nugget by rubbing on her special gold nugget necklace.

Voice cast
Frank Welker – Nugget Nose
Marilyn Schreffler – Wendy
Pat Parris – Rita
Hal Peary – Fenwick Fuddy

Episodes

Production
Buford and the Galloping Ghost was animated at Filman, an animation studio in Madrid, Spain (headed by Carlos Alfonso and Juan Pina) who did a lot of animation work for Hanna-Barbera between the early 1970s through the mid-1980s.

References

External links
 
 
 The Buford Files at The Big Cartoon DataBase
 The Galloping Ghost at The Big Cartoon DataBase
 The Buford Files at Angelfire

1978 American television series debuts
1979 American television series endings
1970s American animated television series
American children's animated comedy television series
American children's animated fantasy television series
American children's animated horror television series
American children's animated mystery television series
English-language television shows
Western (genre) animated television series
Animated television series about dogs
Animated television series about ghosts
NBC original programming
American animated television spin-offs
Hanna-Barbera characters
Television series by Hanna-Barbera